NH4 or NH 4 or NH-4 may refer to:

 Ammonium, the cation NH4+ in chemistry
 National Highway 4 (India), new numbering for a National Highway in India
 National Highway 4 (India, old numbering), a major National Highway in western and southern India
 New Hampshire Route 4, a short state highway located in eastern Strafford County, New Hampshire, United States